The Slănic (sometimes referred to as Slănic de Gura Ocniței or Slănicul de Jos to distinguish it from other rivers named Slănic) is a left tributary of the river Ialomița in Romania. It discharges into the Ialomița in Comișani.

References

Rivers of Romania
Rivers of Dâmbovița County